Tomáš Šiffalovič (born 23 June 1988) is a Slovak former professional ice hockey player.

He played with clubs including HC Slovan Bratislava in the Slovak Extraliga.

References

Living people
HC Slovan Bratislava players
1988 births
Slovak ice hockey forwards
Ice hockey people from Bratislava